In Greek mythology, Melaena or Melena  (feminine  "black, dark"), Melane  or Melanis was a Corycian nymph, or member of the prophetic Thriae, of the springs of Delphi in Phocis.

Family 
Melaena's father was one of the local river gods, either Kephisos or Pleistos of northern Boeotia. In another account, she was called the daughter of King Hyamus of Hyampolis and Melanthea (Melantho), daughter of Deucalion. Her sister was called Celaeno. 

Melanis was loved by Apollo and bore him Delphos, eponym of Delphi.

Mythology 
Melaina was often identified with Thyia who was also named as the mother of Delphos in other traditions. She was usually confused with the chthonic nymph Melinoë, daughter of Persephone by Hades.

Notes

References 

 Apollonius Rhodius, Argonautica translated by Robert Cooper Seaton (1853-1915), R. C. Loeb Classical Library Volume 001. London, William Heinemann Ltd, 1912. Online version at the Topos Text Project.
 Apollonius Rhodius, Argonautica. George W. Mooney. London. Longmans, Green. 1912. Greek text available at the Perseus Digital Library.
 Pausanias, Description of Greece with an English Translation by W.H.S. Jones, Litt.D., and H.A. Ormerod, M.A., in 4 Volumes. Cambridge, MA, Harvard University Press; London, William Heinemann Ltd. 1918. . Online version at the Perseus Digital Library
 Pausanias, Graeciae Descriptio. 3 vols. Leipzig, Teubner. 1903.  Greek text available at the Perseus Digital Library.

Thriae
Naiads
Nymphs
Princesses in Greek mythology
Women of Apollo

Phocian characters in Greek mythology
Mythology of Phocis